Live in Vienna, or Live in Vienna, December 1st, 2016, is a triple-disc live album by the English progressive rock band King Crimson, originally released in a limited capacity in Japan as Live in Vienna 2016 + Live in Tokyo 2015 on 27 September 2017. The expanded album, just titled Live in Vienna, was released through Discipline Global Mobile on 6 April 2018.

Content
Live in Vienna was recorded on 1 December 2016 at Museumsquartier in Vienna, Austria. The first two discs of Live in Vienna cover the entire first and second sets of the concert. The third disc on the original Japanese release was a bonus disc featuring live tracks from King Crimson's 2015 tour of Japan. On the main release, the third disc comprises one of the band's first performances of "Fracture" since 1974, two encores from the show in Vienna, and newly sequenced pieces with excerpts from Robert Fripp's soundscapes edited into them.

Critical reception

Writing for All About Jazz, John Kelman praised the album, especially the third disc's version of "Fracture" and its live improvisations, which he called "a primary reason to consider Live in Vienna an essential listen."

Track listing

Notes
 "Fracture" was performed at Falconer Salen in Copenhagen, Denmark on 23 September 2016.

Personnel
Credits adapted from liner notes.

King Crimson
 Robert Fripp – guitar, keyboards, mastering, production
 Mel Collins – saxophone, flute
 Tony Levin – bass, chapman stick, voice, photography
 Pat Mastelotto – drums
 Gavin Harrison – drums
 Jeremy Stacey – drums, keyboards
 Jakko Jakszyk – guitar, flute, voice

Additional personnel
 David Singleton – photography, liner notes, production, mastering
 Ben Singleton – artwork
 Chris Porter – mixing, mastering
 Alan Jones – photography
 Dave Salt – photography
 Hugh O'Donnell – layout, design

Charts

References

External links
Tony Levin's diary entry for the Vienna show

2018 live albums
King Crimson live albums
Discipline Global Mobile albums